18 Presents is a 2020 Italian drama film written and directed by Francesco Amato, with Vittoria Puccini, Benedetta Porcaroli and Edoardo Leo in lead roles. The film is based on an actual Italian woman, Elisa Girotto, who had planned and allocated 17 years of birthday gifts for her daughter Anna before her death in September 2017 due to a terminal breast cancer. Girotto had been diagnosed with cancer at the time that she gave birth to her daughter, in August 2016 at the age of 40. The film was released on 2 January 2020, and received positive reviews for its emotional screenplay. Elisa's husband Alessio Vincenzotto was also credited for his story about his wife. It was also streamed on Netflix on 8 May 2020, which was Mothers' Day in the United States.

Plot
A pregnant mother Elisa (Vittoria Puccini) gives birth to her baby daughter Anna (Benedetta Porcaroli) and attempts to be part of her life by allocating 18 sentimental emotional gifts for her unborn daughter, soon after realising that she has breast cancer. Elisa does this during her remaining days, to allow Anna to receive her birthday gifts every year on her birthday until age 18. Elisa dies shortly after giving birth and Anna gets to know about her mother's love and sacrifice after growing up and feels guilty.

Cast
 Vittoria Puccini as Elisa Girotto
 Benedetta Porcaroli as Anna Vincenzotto
 Edoardo Leo as Alessio Vincenzotto
  as Carla
 Marco Messeri as Nonno
  as Nonna

Production
Principal photography commenced in 2019 and was produced jointly by Lucky Red, 3 Marys Entertainment and Rai Cinema. The film's trailer was released on 11 December 2019.

Reception

User-generated website "Bechdel Test" lists '18 Presents' as one of the 2020 women-oriented films.

References

External links
 
 

2020 films
2020s Italian-language films
Italian drama films
Italian-language Netflix original films
2020 drama films
2020s Italian films